Pariya Junhasavasdikul (born 14 August 1984) is a Thai professional golfer.

Junhasavasdikul played college golf at Purdue University (where he majored in business management) in the United States.

Junhasavasdikul turned professional in 2008 and plays on the Asian Tour. He won the 2010 Mercuries Taiwan Masters and the 2013 Worldwide Holdings Selangor Masters.

Professional wins (4)

Asian Tour wins (2)

Asian Tour playoff record (1–0)

Professional Golf Tour of India wins (1)

ASEAN PGA Tour wins (1)

Results in World Golf Championships

"T" = Tied

References

External links

Profile on Purdue University's athletic site

Pariya Junhasavasdikul
Asian Tour golfers
Krannert School of Management alumni
Pariya Junhasavasdikul
1984 births
Living people